The following is a list of winners for the PMPC Star Awards for TV for 2002.

Host

Pops Fernandez
Aiai delas Alas

Performers

Nominees and winners

BEST EDUCATIONAL PROGRAM: Knowledge Power (ABS-CBN 2)

BEST EDUCATIONAL PROGRAM HOST: Ernie Baron - Knowledge Power (ABS-CBN 2)

BEST FANTASY/HORROR PROGRAM: Wansapanataym (ABS-CBN 2)

BEST CHILDREN’S PROGRAM: 5 & Up (GMA 7)

BEST CHILDREN’S PROGRAM HOSTS: 5 & Up Kids (GMA 7)

BEST YOUTH-ORIENTED PROGRAM: Click (GMA 7)

BEST MORNING SHOW: Unang Hirit (GMA 7)

BEST MORNING SHOW HOSTS: Arnold Clavio, Lyn Ching, Miriam Quiambao, Suzie Entrata, Rhea Santos, Martin Andanar, Ivan Maryina, Hans Montenegro and Co. - Unang Hirit (GMA 7)

BEST GAME SHOW: Game K N B? (ABS-CBN 2)

BEST GAME SHOW HOST: Kris Aquino -  Game K N B? (ABS-CBN 2)

BEST NEW MALE TV PERSONALITY: Paolo Ballesteros - Daddy Di Do Du (GMA 7)

BEST NEW FEMALE TV PERSONALITY: Nancy Castiliogne - Sana Ay Ikaw Na Nga (GMA 7)

BEST LIFESTYLE PROGRAM: F (ABS-CBN 2)

BEST LIFESTYLE PROGRAM HOSTS: Angel Aquino, Cher Calvin & Daphne Oseña - F (ABS-CBN 2)

BEST CELEBRITY TALK SHOW: Private Conversations (ABS-CBN 2)

BEST CELEBRITY TALK SHOW HOST: Boy Abunda - Private Conversations (ABS-CBN 2)

BEST SHOWBIZ-ORIENTED SHOW: Startalk (GMA 7)

BEST MALE SHOWBIZ-ORIENTED SHOW HOST: Boy Abunda - The Buzz (ABS-CBN 2)

BEST FEMALE SHOWBIZ-ORIENTED SHOW HOST: Kris Aquino - The Buzz (ABS-CBN 2)

BEST GAG SHOW: Bubble Gang (GMA 7)

BEST COMEDY SHOW: Kool Ka Lang (GMA 7)

BEST COMEDY ACTORS: Michael V. (GMA 7)/Ogie Alcasid (GMA 7)

BEST COMEDY ACTRESS: Ai-Ai Delas Alas - Whattamen (ABS-CBN 2)

BEST PUBLIC SERVICE PROGRAM: Mission X (ABS-CBN 2)

BEST PUBLIC SERVICE PROGRAM HOST: Erwin Tulfo - Mission X (ABS-CBN 2)

BEST PUBLIC AFFAIRS PROGRAM: Debate (GMA 7)

BEST PUBLIC AFFAIRS PROGRAM HOSTS: Winnie Monsod & Oscar Orbos - Debate (GMA 7)

BEST MAGAZINE PROGRAM: Jessica Soho Reports (GMA 7)

BEST MAGAZINE PROGRAM HOST: Jessica Soho - Jessica Soho Reports (GMA 7)

BEST TRAVEL SHOW: Cheche Lazaro Presents (GMA 7)

BEST TRAVEL SHOW HOST: Cheche Lazaro - Cheche Lazaro Presents (GMA 7)

BEST NEWS PROGRAM: Frontpage (GMA 7)

BEST MALE NEWSCASTER: Henry Omaga-Diaz - TV Patrol (ABS-CBN 2)

BEST FEMALE NEWSCASTER: Mel Tiangco - Frontpage (GMA 7)/Korina Sanchez - TV Patrol (ABS-CBN 2)

BEST DRAMA SERIES: Kung Mawawala Ka (GMA 7)

BEST DRAMA MINI-SERIES: Pira-pirasong Pangarap (GMA 7)

BEST DRAMA ANTHOLOGY: Maalaala Mo Kaya (ABS-CBN 2)

BEST DRAMA ACTOR: Eddie Garcia - Kung Mawawala Ka (GMA 7)

BEST DRAMA ACTRESS: Jean Garcia - Pangako Sa'Yo (ABS-CBN 2)

BEST DRAMA ACTOR IN A SINGLE PERFORMANCE: Paolo Contis - MMK: Chicken Feet (ABS-CBN 2)

BEST DRAMA ACTRESS IN A SINGLE PERFORMANCE: Regine Velasquez - MMK: Lobo (ABS-CBN 2)

BEST VARIETY SHOW: Eat Bulaga! (GMA 7)

BEST MUSICAL VARIETY SHOW: SOP (GMA 7)

BEST MALE VARIETY SHOW HOST: Vic Sotto - Eat Bulaga! (GMA 7)

BEST FEMALE VARIETY SHOW HOST: Pops Fernandez - ASAP (ABS-CBN 2)

BEST TV STATION: GMA 7

PMPC Star Awards for Television